Hanakago (花籠) is a Japanese language term and means "flower basket". In Japanese bamboo weaving, a flower basket is used in ikebana and sometimes also used in Japanese tea ceremony. 

Named after it are: 
, a stable of sumo wrestlers
Hanakago stable (1992), a later incarnation of the stable
Hanakago (toshiyori), a sumo toshiyori held by Daijuyama Tadaaki as of 2020

Japanese words and phrases
Japanese bamboowork
Chadō
Ikebana

ja:花籠